Seven Days Leave is a 1930 American Pre-Code drama film produced and directed by Richard Wallace and starring Gary Cooper, Beryl Mercer, and Daisy Belmore.

Based on the 1918 play The Old Lady Shows Her Medals by J.M. Barrie, the film is about a young Canadian soldier (Gary Cooper)  wounded while fighting in World War I. While recovering from his wounds in London, a YMCA worker tells him that a Scottish widow (Beryl Mercer) without a son believes that he is in fact her son. To comfort the widow, the soldier agrees to pretend to be her Scottish son. After fighting with British sailors who make fun of his kilts, he wants to desert, but moved by his mother's patriotism he returns to the war front and is killed in battle. Later the proud Scottish widow receives the medals that her "son" was awarded for bravery. Produced by Louis D. Lighton and Richard Wallace for Paramount Pictures, the film was released on January 25, 1930 in the United States.

Cast
 Gary Cooper as Kenneth Downey
 Beryl Mercer as Sarah Ann Dowey
 Daisy Belmore as Emma Mickelham
 Nora Cecil as Amelia Twymley
 Tempe Pigott as Mrs. Haggerty
 Arthur Hoyt as Mr. Willings
 Arthur Metcalfe as Colonel
 Basil Radford as Corporal
 Larry Steers as Aide-de-Camp

Critical response
In his review for The New York Times, critic Mordaunt Hall described the film as a "sensitive production" that was "intensely interesting" and "tender, charming and whimsical". Hall credits the film's success to the direction of Richard Wallace and the performances of Beryl Mercer—reprising her role as the elderly charwoman in the original 1917 New York stage production—and the young Gary Cooper.

Hall praised Wallace's realistic depictions of London and the charwomen, and noted the Paramount audience's response of laughter and applause to several scenes. Hall also described the screen adaptation by John Farrow and Dan Totheroh as "a capital piece of work in blending the Barrie lines with scenes that were left to the imagination in the play".

Production
The screenplay is based on the play The Old Lady Shows Her Medals by J. M. Barrie, which premiered in New York on May 14, 1917.

References

External links
 
 
 

1930 films
1930 romantic drama films
American romantic drama films
American black-and-white films
Paramount Pictures films
American World War I films
Films based on works by J. M. Barrie
Films directed by Richard Wallace
1930s English-language films
1930s American films